Billy Gasparino is the Director of Amateur Scouting for the Los Angeles Dodgers of Major League Baseball.

Playing career
Gasparino attended Oklahoma State University  (OSU), where he played college baseball for the Oklahoma State Cowboys baseball team as an infielder. He was drafted out of OSU by the Colorado Rockies in the 17th round (520th overall) of the 1999 Major League Baseball Draft. He hit .260/.373/.388 in his lone minor league (MiLB) career.

Scouting career

San Diego Padres (2012-2014)
In the fall of 2010, Gasparino was hired by the San Diego Padres from the Toronto Blue Jays to serve the position as the national crosschecker. Afterwards, in 2012, Gasparino was promoted out of his crosschecker position to become their director of scouting.

Los Angeles Dodgers
On November 7, 2014, Gasparino was hired by the Los Angeles Dodgers.

Under Gasparino as scouting director, the Dodgers have drafted current players such as Walker Buehler, Dustin May, Will Smith, Tony Gonsolin, Edwin Rios, Gavin Lux, Matt Beaty, and Mitchell White.

Other draftees under Gasparino include Devin Smeltzer, Luke Raley, Andre Scrubb, A.J. Alexy, Dean Kremer, Connor Wong, Zach Pop and Rylan Bannon, all of whom were used in trades to acquire key veterans.

References

Living people
Oklahoma State Cowboys baseball players
Portland Rockies players
Baseball players from Florida
Los Angeles Dodgers executives
Place of birth missing (living people)
Year of birth missing (living people)